Qabeleh or Qebleh may refer to:

Qebleh, Ilam
Qebleh, Lorestan

See also
Qebleh Ei (disambiguation)
Qeblehi (disambiguation)
Qibleh (disambiguation)